"Für dich" (also spelled Für Dich; "For You") is a song by German singer Yvonne Catterfeld, produced by Dieter Bohlen and written by Bohlen, Klaus Hirschburger and Lukas Hilbert. Recorded for Catterfeld's debut studio album, Meine Welt (2003), the ballad was released on 5 May 2003 as its fourth single.

Charts

Weekly charts

Year-end charts

References

2003 singles
Number-one singles in Germany
Number-one singles in Switzerland
Number-one singles in Austria
Songs written by Dieter Bohlen
Songs written by Lukas Loules
Songs written by Klaus Hirschburger
Song recordings produced by Dieter Bohlen
2003 songs